Diaphanosoma is a genus of Sididae.

The genus was described in 1850 by Fischer.

It has cosmopolitan distribution.
In the water bodies of the world, at least 4 (or 6) species of Diaphanosoma are non-native species, many of which pose a great threat to aquatic ecosystems.

Species:
 Diaphanosoma amurensis Korovchinsky & Sheveleva, 2009
 Diaphanosoma australiensis Korovchinsky, 1981
 Diaphanosoma fluviatile Hansen, 1899

References

Cladocera